Eddie Alderson (born October 27, 1994) is an American actor, best known for his portrayal of Matthew Buchanan on the ABC Daytime American soap opera One Life to Live in 2001 until 2012. Alderson's performance in the role has been met with critical acclaim, having garnered two Young Artist Award nominations in 2009 and a Daytime Emmy Award nomination in 2012.

Early life and career
Eddie Alderson was born in Bucks County, Pennsylvania, to Rich and Kathy Alderson.

Alderson has portrayed Matthew Buchanan on ABC's  One Life to Live since May 10, 2001.  He was put on contract with the OLTL series in December 2008. Alderson's older sister, Kristen Alderson, has portrayed his OLTL friend, Starr Manning, since March 20, 1998.
In 2007, Alderson appeared with Mark Ruffalo in Reservation Road.  Alderson later played Sanford Clark in the film Changeling (2008).  He also portrayed the friend of a murdered boy on Law & Order.

Personal life
Alderson was diagnosed with lymphoma cancer in November 2016. On April 26, 2017, it was reported by ABC Soaps in Depth that he finished his first round of chemotherapy. On July 13, 2017, announced through ABC Soaps in Depth, Alderson was back in chemotherapy.

Filmography

Film

Television

Awards and nominations

References

External links
 

1994 births
American male child actors
American male soap opera actors
Living people
People from Bucks County, Pennsylvania
21st-century American male actors